Makkink & Bey is an architecture and design practice based in Rotterdam and also in the Noordoostpolder. The studio, founded in 2002, is led by architect Rianne Makkink and designer Jurgen Bey, and works in various domains of applied arts including public space projects, product design, architecture and exhibition design.

Bey teaches at the Royal College of Art, London, and since 2010 he is the director of the Sandberg Institute, Amsterdam. Makkink teaches at the architecture department of Ghent University, and is a tutor at the Design Academy Eindhoven.

Awards

2009 - Nomination for the Rotterdam Design Prize, for Prooff Lab
2008 - Awarded with Woonbeurspin 2008, for collected works
2007 - Nomination for the Rotterdam Design Prize, for best studio
2005 - Prins Bernard Cultuurfonds Award, for collected works
2005 - Harrie Tillie Award, Stedelijk museum, Roermond, for collected works
2003 - Interior award 2003, Lensvelt / de Architect, for meeting room Interpolis
2003 - Nomination the Rotterdam Design Prize, for LinnenkasThuis
2003 - Elle Deco Award Lighting and Accessories, for Light Shade Shade

References

External links

Prooff website
Eigen Huis & Interieur Top 25 Dutch Designers
Interieur Kortrijk Projectroom by Studio Makkink&Bey

Architecture firms of the Netherlands
Design companies of the Netherlands
Companies based in Amsterdam
Design companies established in 2002
Noordoostpolder
Culture in Rotterdam
Dutch companies established in 2002